The 2018–19 season was Swansea City's 99th season in the English football league system, and their first season back in the Championship since 2010–11 following relegation from the Premier League in the previous season. Along with competing in the Championship, the club would compete in the FA Cup and EFL Cup. The season covered the period from 1 July 2018 to 30 June 2019.

Club

First-team staff
Last updated on 29 June 2018

First-team squad

Transfers

Transfers in

Transfers out

Loans in

Loans out

New contracts

Pre-season
As of 18 June 2018, Swansea City have confirmed to take part in the Interwetten Cup in Germany against Magdeburg and Genoa before travelling to Austria for a six-day training camp to face Eibar and Freiburg. Prior to the tour Swansea City will face Yeovil Town.

Friendlies

Interwetten Cup

Competitions

Overview

{| class="wikitable" style="text-align: center"
|-
!rowspan=2|Competition
!colspan=8|Record
|-
!
!
!
!
!
!
!
!
|-
| Championship

|-
| FA Cup

|-
| EFL Cup

|-
! Total

Championship

League table

Results summary

Results by matchday

Matches

On 21 June 2018, Swansea City's 2018-2019 Championship fixtures were announced.

FA Cup

The third round draw was made live on BBC by Ruud Gullit and Paul Ince from Stamford Bridge on 3 December 2018. The fourth round draw was made live on BBC by Robbie Keane and Carl Ikeme from Wolverhampton. The fifth round draw was broadcast on 28 January 2019 live on BBC, Alex Scott and Ian Wright conducted the draw. Draw for the quarter-final was made on 18 February by Darren Fletcher & Wayne Bridge.

EFL Cup

The second round draw was made from the Stadium of Light on 16 August.

Statistics

Appearances, goals, and cards
Last updated on 5 May 2019

References

Swansea City
Swansea City A.F.C. seasons
Welsh football clubs 2018–19 season